This is a list of VTV dramas released in 2006.

←2005 - 2006 - 2007→

VTV Tet dramas
These films air on VTV channels during Tet holiday.

VTV1

VTV3

Vietnamese dramas in VTV1 Weeknight time slot
Starting in 2006, Saturday night was removed from VTV1 night drama time slot after 10 months added.

These dramas air from 21:05 to 21:55, Monday to Friday on VTV1.

Note: Unlisted airtime periods were spent for foreign dramas.

VTV3 Cinema For Saturday Afternoon dramas
These dramas air in early Saturday afternoon on VTV3 with the duration approximately 70 minutes as a part of the program Cinema for Saturday afternoon (Vietnamese: Điện ảnh chiều thứ Bảy).

VTV3 Sunday Literature & Art dramas
These dramas air in early Sunday afternoon on VTV3 as a part of the program Sunday Literature & Art (Vietnamese: Văn nghệ Chủ Nhật).

See also
 List of dramas broadcast by Vietnam Television (VTV)
 List of dramas broadcast by Hanoi Radio Television (HanoiTV)
 List of dramas broadcast by Vietnam Digital Television (VTC)

References

External links
VTV.gov.vn – Official VTV Website 
VTV.vn – Official VTV Online Newspaper 

Vietnam Television original programming
2006 in Vietnamese television